Blackbird is a 2018 spy film directed, produced, written by and starring Michael Flatley. With a release delayed for several years, Blackbird was dismissed as a vanity project by the entertainment press, Brian Lloyd of entertainment.ie comparing Flatley to Tommy Wiseau of The Room infamy.

Plot
The secret agent "Blackbird" retires and opens a nightclub in the Caribbean to escape his past. A former lover comes to meet him, but brings trouble with her.

Cast
Eric Roberts as Blake
Patrick Bergin as The Head
Ian Beattie as Nick
Rachel Warren as Brea
Serhat Metin as Muhammed
Nicole Evans as Vivian
Michael Flatley as Victor Blackley

Production
Filming took place in County Cork, London and Barbados. It was largely financed by Flatley himself.

Release
The first screening was a June 2018 private showing for cast and crew at the Stella Cinema, Rathmines, Dublin; Blackbird was shown at The May Fair Hotel, London as part of the Raindance Film Festival on 28 September 2018.

In 2018, Flatley claimed to be in pre-production for Blackbird 2. However, there was little news on a general release of Blackbird, fuelling speculation about the film's quality. In 2019, Brian Lloyd of entertainment.ie wrote a lengthy investigation of the film, finding out that "over 200 people attended the screening of 'Blackbird', and so far as can be reasonably determined, none of them were journalists or critics. When asked if perhaps the jury of Raindance Film Festival may have seen 'Blackbird', [David Martinez, a festival producer with Raindance] says this did not take place."

A general release of the film to Irish cinemas had been announced for September 2, 2022. The film premiered August 2022 in the Light House Cinema in Dublin.

Critical response

On Rotten Tomatoes, the film holds an approval rating of 22% based on 9 reviews, with an average rating of 2.00 out of 10. Film critic Mark Kermode said the film was “one of the worst films I’ve ever seen”. Peter Bradshaw of The Guardian gave the film one out of five stars, lambasting the writing and directing, remarking, 'In a way, it is amazing that Flatley is able to fulfil a 12-year-old boy’s fantasy of being a secret agent, with a 12-year-old’s idea of what a secret agent actually does. The acting and writing are like the non-sexy bits that come between the sexy bits in a porn film made in 1985.'. Ed Power in The Telegraph also gave it one out of five stars, dubbing it 'unintentionally hilarious.' Empire Magazine's Ian Freer opined, 'By far the best performance in the film is by Flatley’s seemingly endless collection of hats, the jaunty angle of a trilby suggesting more emotion than the actor ever does'.

References

External links
 

2018 films
2010s English-language films
2010s British films
British spy thriller films
Films shot in County Cork
Films shot in Barbados
Films set in Barbados
Films set in London